Thomas Thompson (10 November 1928 – 15 September 2015) was an English footballer who played in the Football League for Aston Villa, Barrow, Newcastle United, Preston North End and Stoke City as well as the England national team.

Career
Tommy ‘Topper’ Thompson was born in Fencehouses, Houghton-le-Spring, County Durham in 1928. He played for Lumley YMCA at junior level and while only 17 he was signed by Newcastle United in January 1946. He made his league debut in the 1947-48 promotion season at Coventry City and scored twice in his four second division appearances. Over the next two seasons he played only 16 games, scoring 4 goals. When manager George Martin left Tyneside in 1950, Thompson soon followed Martin to Aston Villa for £12,500. He made his debut against Blackpool in September of that year, the first of 149 league games for Villa, in which he scored 67 goals. Whilst at Villa Park he earned himself an England cap. He played for England in the 1-1 draw with Wales in Cardiff on 20 October, 1951. He reached double figures in all but one of his five seasons, managing only 9 in the 1952-53 season. At the end of the 1954-55 season Aston Villa announced they would sell Thompson, but only for the right price. On top of his league record he scored 9 goals in 16 FA Cup appearances, to total 76 goals in 165 matches.

Thompson was sold to Preston North End in August 1955 for £27,000, after their initial offer of £20,000 was rejected. New signing Thompson scored after two minutes on his debut, a 4–0 away win at Everton. In quick time he and Tom Finney created a formidable partnership. Thompson finished his first season with 23 goals with Finney netting 18. The following season Thompson scored 26, his contribution in a 57 goal partnership with Finney. His third season saw him score 34 goals in 41 league games, setting a club record for most goals in a top flight season that still stands today. He also won his second England cap, six years after his first, as England beat Scotland 2-1 at Wembley on 6 April, 1957. The next two seasons saw him play only 34 times, scoring 14 goals. After six seasons at Deepdale he ended his Preston career after scoring 129 goals in 212 matches.

He joined Stoke City in August 1961 and scored on his debut against Rotherham United, as he top scored for the Potters with 16 league goals. He played five more times for Stoke, scoring once more the following season, before leaving to join Barrow, who played in the fourth division. Over the next two seasons at Barrow, he scored 16 goals in 44 league appearances. He retired at the end of 1963-64 season, ending his league career with 222 goals in 444 appearances. 187 of those goals were scored in the first division, which ranks Tommy Thompson at 37 of the all-time top scorers in the top flight of English football.

He died at the age of 86 on 15 September 2015.

International career
He acquired his first cap against Wales during the 1951–52 season. He won his second cap in April 1957.

Career statistics

Club
Source:

International
Source:

References

External links
 
 Tommy Thompson Preston profile at pneformerplayers.co.uk

1928 births
2015 deaths
People from Houghton-le-Spring
Footballers from Tyne and Wear
Association football inside forwards
England international footballers
Aston Villa F.C. players
Newcastle United F.C. players
Preston North End F.C. players
Stoke City F.C. players
English Football League players
English Football League representative players
Barrow A.F.C. players
English footballers